"DNA" is the second episode of the science fiction sitcom Red Dwarf Series IV and the twentieth episode in the series' run. It was first broadcast on the British television channel BBC2 on 21 February 1991, although it was planned to be broadcast as the fifth episode, it was moved forward in the schedule by the BBC. Written by Rob Grant and Doug Naylor, and directed by Ed Bye, the episode revolves around the genetic engineering technology that the crew discover.

Plot
Red Dwarf encounters a drifting spacecraft which Arnold Rimmer, Dave Lister, Kryten, and Cat decide to investigate. Once on board, the group split into pairs. While Rimmer and Kryten find the remains of a mutated human with three heads, Cat accidentally activates a machine that turns Lister into a chicken. When the others arrive, Kryten determines that the ship's crew were researching DNA modifications and that the machine Cat used can rewrite the DNA of anything with organic matter. When an attempt to reverse the effect on Lister changes him into a hamster, Cat repeats the actions he did to change him. However, while Lister is restored to his human body, Kryten finds himself turned into a human, due to his brain being part-organic.

Returning to Red Dwarf, Kryten is initially ecstatic at being human, but finds he cannot conduct certain functions that he did as a mechanoid, and soon regrets the change after he insults his mechanoid spare heads, as well as revealing his sexual arousal to machines in a machine catalogue that he reads. The group agree to help him return to his original form, but Rimmer suggests they use a test subject first on the DNA modifier as a precaution. Lister opts to have the machine change the meat in his vindaloo, but the modifier changes it into a living mutant beast that proves to be indestructible to their weapons. Lister opts to be changed into a powerful fighting machine and becomes a cyborg that he calls "Man Plus", only to be a foot in height. However, he soon discovers that the creature is weak to lager when it stands in some spilled from a can, and so throws another into its mouth and shoots the can, killing the creature explosively.

Production
"DNA", official full title "Do Not Alter", changed the continuity of the relationship between Lister and Kristine Kochanski. It is established that they had been dating and that she broke up with him, an idea which had been introduced in the novel Infinity Welcomes Careful Drivers. Doug Naylor and Craig Charles explained that Lister's infatuation with Kochanski, despite barely knowing her, was unrealistic.

With the tail end of production and finances running low the DNA ship's set was rushed and was not as had been expected. However, the grungy-looking corridors and rooms were better than nothing which may have been the case.

Paul McGuinness, a member of the effects team, wore the Vindaloo Mutant outfit. He also produced the three-headed corpse that Kryten and Rimmer discover on board the DNA ship. Richard Ridings voices the D.N.A. Ship Computer.

A cast-inspired gag came in at the end of the scene with Rimmer planning to clone himself from his own dandruff. Timing it just right into the rehearsals, Danny John-Jules sneezed on the microscope at the right moment.

Blue-screen techniques was used to produce the transformation of Lister to a  "super-human" man plus. Craig Charles was shot in front of a bluescreen to make him appear one foot tall, while this was added to the other crew's footage, who were also involved in blue screen, as they run by the small Lister.

Cultural references
The 1935 film Bride of Frankenstein is referenced by the Cat regarding the way he looks when he cannot use an electrical socket to blow-dry his hair.

Rimmer initially concludes that the spacecraft encountered is alien and that it is attempting to contact the Red Dwarf crew in order to return Glenn Miller. This references the alien abduction myth of Miller, whose plane went missing in 1944 and was never found.

Lister attributes Popeye the Sailor Man's saying "I am what I am" to Descartes (in reference to the latter's famous line, "I think, therefore I am"), but the attribution is corrected by Rimmer. (Kryten later makes the same mistake.)

Using the DNA modifier, Holly turns Lister into a super-human fighting machine "Man Plus". The result transforms Lister into a small replica hybrid of RoboCop from the 1987 film of the same name.

When Lister is being chased by the vindaloo mutation he parodies Bruce Willis' line from Die Hard 2 (1990); "How can the same smeg happen to the same guy twice?", referencing the previous series when he was attacked by what he thought to be a shami kebab in "Polymorph". Jaws is then parodied in the final scene when Lister disposes of the vindaloo mutation by throwing a lager can into its mouth and then shooting at the can, making it explode along with the mutation.

Reception
"DNA" was first broadcast on the British television channel BBC2 on 21 February 1991 in the 9:00 p.m. evening time slot, although it was intended to be broadcast fifth in the series run—as seen in the repeat showings in 1992 and 1994. The change in the scheduling was affected by the Gulf War hostilities at the time, which meant that "Dimension Jump", originally the series' opener, and "Meltdown" were held back.

The episode was considered to be one of the better episodes from the fourth series; however, it did receive some criticism for moving the humour away from the characters and into situation-based comedy.

Notes

References

External links

Series IV episode guide at www.reddwarf.co.uk

Red Dwarf IV episodes
1991 British television episodes
Television episodes about genetic engineering